Tom Doncaster was an English professional footballer who played for Barnsley and Cardiff City.

Honours
Cardiff City
 Southern Football League Second Division winner: 1912–13

References

1888 births
Year of death missing
English footballers
Kiveton Park F.C. players
Barnsley F.C. players
Cardiff City F.C. players
English Football League players
Southern Football League players
Association football defenders
Association football midfielders